The Hyundai i20 N Rally2 is a rally car developed and built by Hyundai Motorsport to Group Rally2 specifications. It is based upon the Hyundai i20 N road car and is the successor to Hyundai i20 R5.

Competition history
The car was debuted at the 2021 Ypres Rally. Despite of a victory in its competing category from Jari Huttunen and Mikko Lukka, both of the entered crews underwent power steering issue. Oliver Solberg and Aaron Johnston suffered more electrical issue, retiring the rally from the lead.

Rally victories

World Rally Championship-2

World Rally Championship-3

Rally results

WRC-2 results

 Season in progress

References

External links
 
 Hyundai i20 N Rally2 at eWRC-results.com

Rally2 cars
All-wheel-drive vehicles
i20 N Rally2